Frenchman's Creek is a 1941 historical novel by Daphne du Maurier.  Set in Cornwall during the reign of Charles II, it tells the story of a love affair between an impulsive English lady, Dona, Lady St. Columb, and a French pirate, Jean-Benoit Aubéry.

Synopsis
Dona, Lady St. Columb, makes a sudden visit with her children to Navron, her husband's remote estate in Cornwall, in a fit of disgust with her shallow life in London court society.  There she finds that the property, unoccupied for several years, is being used as a base by a notorious French pirate who has been terrorising the Cornish coast.  Dona finds that the pirate, Jean-Benoit Aubéry, is not a desperate character at all, but rather a more educated and cultured man than her own doltish husband, and they fall in love.

Dona dresses as a boy and joins the pirate crew on an expedition to cut out and capture a richly laden merchant ship belonging to one of her neighbours.  The attack is a success, but the news of it brings Dona's husband Harry and his friend Rockingham to Cornwall, disrupting her idyllic romance. Harry, Rockingham, and the other locals meet at Navron to plot how to capture the pirate, but Aubéry and his crew cleverly manage to capture and rob their would-be captors instead.  Rockingham, who has had designs on Dona himself, perceives the relationship between her and Aubéry, and Dona is forced to kill him in self-defence when he attacks her in a jealous rage. Meanwhile, Aubéry is captured while trying to return to his ship, and Dona hatches a plot for his release. This is successful, but in the end she chooses to stay with her husband for the sake of her children, while he returns to his ship.

Adaptations
The 1944 film, Frenchman's Creek starring Joan Fontaine, Arturo de Córdova, and Basil Rathbone (as Rockingham) is a fairly faithful adaptation of the novel. It also starred Nigel Bruce, Rathbone's old Sherlock Holmes film partner, in their only non-Holmes/Watson screen appearance together.

A television film of 1998 starred Tara Fitzgerald as Dona, James Fleet as her husband, and Anthony Delon as the Frenchman. Whilst possibly more historically accurate, it varied greatly from the du Maurier original.

1942 British novels
Novels by Daphne du Maurier
Novels about pirates
Novels set in Cornwall
Victor Gollancz Ltd books
British novels adapted into films

fr:L'aventure vient de la mer